Carlos Ortíz may refer to:
 Carlos Ortiz (boxer) (1936–2022), Puerto Rican boxer
 Carlos Escobar Ortiz (born 1989), Chilean footballer
 Carlos Ortiz (wrestler)  (born 1974), retired wrestler from Cuba
 Carlos Arias Ortiz, Mexican biochemist
 Carlos Ortiz (golfer) (born 1991), Mexican golfer
 Carlos Javier Ortiz (born 1977), American documentary photographer
 Carlos Vieco Ortiz (1900–1979), Colombian musician and composer